Zeta Draconis (ζ Draconis, abbreviated Zet Dra, ζ Dra) is a binary star in the northern circumpolar constellation of Draco. With an apparent visual magnitude of +3.17, it is the fifth-brightest member of this generally faint constellation.

The two components are designated Zeta Draconis A (formally named Aldhibah , after the traditional name of the system) and B.

Nomenclature 

ζ Draconis (Latinised to Zeta Draconis) is the system's Bayer designation. The designations of the two components as Zeta Draconis A and B derives from the convention used by the Washington Multiplicity Catalog (WMC) for multiple star systems, and adopted by the International Astronomical Union (IAU).

Zeta Draconis has the old Arabic name الذئب al-dhiʼb "the wolf" or "the hyena", given in its feminine form "Al Dhiʼbah" (ذئبة) in Allen (1899) (though he mistranslated it as plural "hyenas", which would be الضباع al-ḍibāʽ). It shares the dual form of the name, الذئبين al-dhiʼbayn, with Eta Draconis. It is also known as Nodus III (Third Knot, the knot being a loop in the tail of Draco).

In 2016, the IAU organized a Working Group on Star Names (WGSN) to catalog and standardize proper names for stars. The WGSN decided to attribute proper names to individual stars rather than entire multiple systems. It approved the name Aldhibah for the component Zeta Draconis A on 5 September 2017. It also approved the name Athebyne for Eta Draconis A on the same date. Both are now so included in the List of IAU-approved Star Names.

Zeta Draconis is mentioned in Hindu texts as Tara who was a celestial goddess married to Lord Brhaspati. A divine epic was played out in the night sky when Lord Chandra, the moon, lusted after and abducted Tara, the blue pole star of Brhaspati, the planet Jupiter. By the completion of the epic Tara gives birth to Lord Budha, or Mercury.

Properties 

Zeta Draconis A is a giant star with a stellar classification of B6 III. Compared to the Sun, this star is about 2.5 times larger, 3.5 times more massive, and is radiating 148 times as much luminosity. This energy is being emitted from the star's outer envelope at an effective temperature of nearly 13,400 K. The azimuthal rotation velocity along the equator is at least 55 km/s.

The north ecliptic pole is located at right ascension 18h and declination +66.5°. This is located roughly midway between Delta Draconis and Zeta Draconis. The north ecliptic pole almost coincides with the south celestial pole of Venus; Zeta Draconis is also the north pole star of Jupiter.

References

Draco (constellation)
Draconis, Zeta
B-type giants
Aldhibah
083895
Draconis, 22
6396
155763
Durchmusterung objects
Binary stars